Pen Pumlumon Llygad-bychan is a subsidiary summit of Pen Pumlumon Fawr and the third highest summit on the Plynlimon massif, a part of the Cambrian Mountains in the county of Ceredigion, Wales. It is not named on Ordnance Survey walking maps.

The summit is boggy, and is marked by a few stones. The views include Rhos Fawr, Drygarn Fawr, Pen y Garn to the south and Aran Fawddwy, Glasgwm, Tarrenhendre and Tarren y Gesail to the north.

The River Wye, has its source just south of the summit. The glacial lake of Llyn Llygad Rheidiol lies to the north.

References

External links
 www.geograph.co.uk ; photos of Plynlimon and surrounding area

Mountains and hills of Ceredigion
Hewitts of Wales
Nuttalls
Elenydd